The Love Song is a 2016 Taiwanese romance, television series starring Miao Ke-li, Lu Hsueh-Feng, Vivi Lee, Darren Chiu, Tracy Chou, Sean Lee, Steven Sun and Julie Ting. Shooting began on January 15, 2016 and episodes aired as soon as the shoot finished. The original broadcast began on February 24, 2016 on SET Metro, airing weekdays (Monday through Friday) at 8:00 pm.

Synopsis
Loneliness sometimes puts strange ideas into your head. Jiang Hsiao Chien is a married woman who is lonely most of the time because her husband works in Mainland China. In order to feel less alone, Hsiao Chien establishes her own community apartment so that she can surround herself with people and create a warm sense of home. But Ho Hsiao Chuen, Hsiao Chien’s first love and ex-boyfriend, becomes one of her new neighbors. As the two begin to interact with each other again under the same roof, their feelings for each other return. What will Hsiao Chien do when she is faced with the choice of following her heart or staying true to her marriage?

Cast

Main cast
Miao Ke-li as Tao Xiu Qiong 
 呂雪鳳 as Gao Lin Man Man 高林滿滿
 李維維 as Jiang Xiao Qian 蔣曉茜
 邱凱偉 as He Xiao Quan 何孝權
 周采詩 as Xia Yi Qing 夏以晴
 邵翔 as Gao Ding Ya 高定亞
 孫其君 as He Xiao Kang 何孝康
 丁巧唯 as Xu Tong 許彤

Supporting cast
 沈孟生 as Xu Jian Chang 許建昌
 安婕希 as Xiao An 小安
Zhan Jia Ru 詹佳儒 as Hou Zi Da 侯子達
Tannie Huang 黃妤榛 as Yang Ru Ru 楊如如
Zhou Ying 周颖 as Hua Ke Xin 華可欣
Chris Huang 黃書維 as Wang Da Shu 王大樹
Ma Ya 馬雅 as Xiao Mao 小毛
 梅賢治 as Ah Li 阿力

Cameo
 藍鈞天 as Bai Shao Qi 白紹祺
 馬之秦 as Bai Li Bing Yu 白李冰玉
Lai Pei-ying 賴佩瑩 as Shao Qi's employee
 綠茶 as He Bi Sheng 何畢昇
 曾允柔 as Xiao Ya 小雅
 黃沐妍 as Li Li 麗麗
 黃心娣 as Zhen Ni Hua 珍妮花
 博焱 as Gao Ding Yu 高定宇
 康茵茵 as Xiao Ting Ru 蕭亭如
Yu Yen-chen 余彥宸 as Gao Wei Wei 高唯唯
 李佳豫 as Wu Zi Zi 吳姿姿
 黃泰安 as Mr. Ke
 姚黛瑋 as 金飾店老闆娘
 潘慧如 as Liu Tian Ling 劉天凌
 楊雅筑 as Xiao Mei 小美
Lu Wen-hsueh 魯文學 as Wang Yong Da 王永達
Lu Chen-hsi 陸侲曦 as Jian Qi Shou 健氣受
 王家梁 
Yang Li-yin 楊麗音 as Xiao Quan and Xiao Kang's mother

Soundtrack
Give Me One Love 想戀一個愛 by Della Ding 丁噹
The Mask 面具 by Gary Chaw 曹格
Ten Years Later 十年後 by Rene Liu 劉若英
Love Myself More 只是不夠愛自己 by Della Ding 丁噹
Are You Willing? 妳願不願意 by Gary Chaw 曹格
 往前跑 by Gary Chaw 曹格
Starry Sky 星空 by Mayday 五月天
Orange Jasmine 七里香 by Jay Chou 周杰倫
And You? 那你呢 by CosmosPeople 宇宙人
Talk 說 by Murmurshow 慢慢說樂團
Differences by Murmurshow 慢慢說樂團
Love Staying at Home 喜歡待在家 by Murmurshow 慢慢說樂團

Broadcast

Episode ratings
Competing dramas on rival channels airing at the same time slot were:
SET Taiwan - Taste of Life
FTV - Dowry, Spring Flower
TTV - HARU (re-run), Fighting Meiling
CTV - Love Yunge from the Desert, Golden Darling
CTS - Thank You for You Have Loved Me, Nirvana in Fire (re-run), The Legend of Mi Yue
GTV Variety - War Family

Awards and nominations

External links
The Love Song SETTV Official website 
The Love Song EBC Website

References

2016 Taiwanese television series debuts
2016 Taiwanese television series endings
Sanlih E-Television original programming
Eastern Television original programming
Taiwanese romance television series